No. 31 General Reconnaissance School was a Royal Air Force Second World War flight training school located at RCAF Station Charlottetown, PEI. The school trained pilots and observers in the techniques of patrolling oceans using the Avro Anson.  The British school became part of the British Commonwealth Air Training Plan in 1942.

See also
Article XV squadrons
RCAF Eastern Air Command
List of British Commonwealth Air Training Plan facilities in Canada

References

 Hatch, F.J. Aerodrome of Democracy: Canada and the British Commonwealth Air Training Plan 1939–1945. Ottawa: Canadian Department of National Defence, 1983. .

Royal Canadian Air Force